Felice Cervetti (1718 in Turin – 1779)  was an Italian painter, mainly of religious paintings and history.

He is said to have trained with Sebastiano Conca. He painted a large canvas in the choir of the Parish church of Aglie, depicting the Madonna della Neve con Angelo offerente la Basilica romana di Santa Maria Maggiore.

References

1718 births
1779 deaths
18th-century Italian painters
Italian male painters
Painters from Turin
18th-century Italian male artists